Half-Light is the debut solo studio album by American musician Rostam, released on September 15, 2017. The album peaked at #6 on the Billboard Heatseekers chart, and received generally favorable reviews.

Background 
Half-Light was released a year after his departure from his acclaimed indie-pop band, Vampire Weekend, and his successful collaboration with the former The Walkmen singer, Hamilton Leithauser, I Had A Dream That You Were Mine. The album contains several tracks that were written many years before the release of Half-Light, with one song being written ten years prior to the album's release.

Track listing
All tracks written and produced by Rostam Batmanglij, except where noted.

Notes
  signifies a lyricist.

Sample credits
 "Sumer" contains samples from "Sumer Is Icumen In" performed by The Revels Chorus.
 "Never Going To Catch Me" contains an interpolation of "Ndini Baba" by Dumisani Maraire.
 "Don't Let It Get To You" contains a sample from "The Obvious Child" as performed by Paul Simon.
 "When" contains excerpts from "You Are All I See" by Active Child.

Personnel

Musicians
 Rostam Batmanglij – vocals , drum programming , piano , synth , sampler , drums , acoustic guitar , string arrangement , electric guitar , bass , harpsichord , glasser , shaker , 12-string guitar , hand drums , double bass , harmonizer , horn arrangement , slide guitar 
 Cameron Mesirow – backup vocals 
 Garrett Ray – drums 
 Hamilton Berry – cello 
 Tony Flynt – double bass 
 Kelly Zutrau – vocals 
 Nick Rowe – hand claps , lap slaps 
 Jonathan Chu – violin 
 Max Wang – double bass 
 Andrew Bulbrook – violin 
 Angel Deradoorian – vocals , choir vocals 
 Abhiman Kaushal – tabla 
 Binki Shaprio – background vocals 
 Adam Schatz – saxophone 
 Joe Santa Maria – saxophone 

Production
 Rostam Batmanglij – production, mixing , engineering ; design and layout, front cover Polaroid digital pixelation
 Ariel Rechtshaid – additional production , engineering 
 Francis Farewell Starlite – additional production 
 Dave Fridmann – mixing 
 Rob Orton – mixing 
 Emily Lazar – mastering
 Chris Allgood – mastering assistance
 Nick Rowe – engineering 
 Shane Stoneback – engineering 
 Chris Rakestraw – engineering 
 Justin Gerrish – engineering 
 Michael Harris – engineering 
 John DeBold – engineering 
 Chris Kasych – engineering 
 Logan Patrick – engineering 
 Dave Schiffman – engineering 
 Ben Tousley – design and layout
 Ezra Koenig – front cover Polaroid
 Jake Longstreth – back cover painting

Charts

References

2017 albums
Rostam Batmanglij albums
Nonesuch Records albums